The 1986 James Hardie 1000 was an endurance motor race held on 5 October 1986 at the Mount Panorama Circuit, just outside Bathurst in New South Wales, Australia. The race, which was the 27th running of the Bathurst 1000 touring car race, was the fourth round of both the 1986 Australian Endurance Championship and the 1986 Australian Manufacturers' Championship.

The race saw the long-awaited victory of Allan Grice. Grice (in his 15th Great Race start) and his 1986 co-driver and team sponsor through his Chickadee Chicken business Graeme Bailey, took their Roadways Racing built Holden VK Commodore SS Group A to victory over the similar Holden Dealer Team Commodore John Harvey and Neal Lowe. Third was the factory backed Nissan Skyline of pole winner Gary Scott and Terry Shiel.

Dick Johnson and Gregg Hansford finished fourth in their Ford Mustang, while the "Super" team of former rivals Peter Brock and Allan Moffat, who had won 12 of the previous 16 races at Bathurst, finished in fifth place one lap down in their repaired HDT Commodore after losing almost 3 laps in the pits with an oil cooler problem while in a strong second place.

Belgian jeweller Michel Delcourt, who finished 7th with veteran Graham Moore in a Commodore, won the Rookie of the Year award. Moore and Delcourt had qualified a Mitsubishi Starion in 50th place for the 1985 race, but the car was withdrawn and did not start.

Class structure
The race was held for cars complying with Australian Touring Car regulations, which were based on International Group A touring car rules. It included three engine capacity classes.

Class A
For cars of up to 2000cc engine capacity, it saw a variety of cars entered. Most numerous were variations of Toyota Corollas, with individual entries of a turbocharged Fiat Uno, a Ford Escort and a Nissan Gazelle.

Class B
For cars of between 2001 and 3000cc engine capacity, it featured the turbos; Mitsubishi Starion, Nissan Skyline and Volvo 240, but also included Alfa Romeo GTV6, BMW 323i, Mercedes-Benz 190E and Toyota Supra.

Class C
For cars of over 3000cc engine capacity. Apart from a strong presence of BMW 635 CSi, the swansong of the V12 Jaguar XJS, and the first appearance of a turbocharged Ford Sierra, it was the domain of the V8; Holden Commodore SS Group A, Ford Mustang and Rover Vitesse.

Hardies Heroes
In a major change to the format, 1986 was the first time in the history of Hardies Heroes that drivers only had one lap to set a time. From 1978–1985, drivers had two laps in which to set a time.

* Peter Brock had qualified the #05 Holden Dealer Team Commodore 2nd fastest with a 2:18.10 but the car was heavily damaged in a crash in Fridays's qualifying by Allan Moffat and was not repaired in time for Hardies Heroes and was subsequently withdrawn from the session by the team. Race organisers the Australian Racing Drivers Club (ARDC) then elevated the Graeme Crosby Commodore into the Top 10 Runoff in its place. Brock had also qualified the HDT's #3 car with a time of 2:17.7 (good enough for 2nd behind Grice), but the race rules prevented car swapping in qualifying and his time only served to qualify him in car #3 for the race and not Hardie's Heroes. He had also set his qualifying time running on Dunlop Tyres and not the Yokohama's he was required by contract to run when the television cameras were running in the runoff.* Through their mutual Philip Morris cigarette sponsorship, the Peter Jackson Nissan team had tyre warmers for their cars flown out from the McLaren Formula One team in England to cope with the cold conditions, the first time the technology had been used in Australian touring car racing. Despite this and the fact that he was the only driver to improve on his qualifying time, pole winner Gary Scott believed the tyres on the Nissan Skyline RS DR30 were still not up to full operating temperature.* The 1986 version of Hardie's Heroes saw four new drivers contesting the Saturday morning runoff for pole position. Pole winner Scott, John Bowe (5th), Graeme Crosby (7th), and Brad Jones (10th). Jones aborted his lap in Hardies Heroes at the top of the mountain after the smaller wheels caused the car to handle badly.

Official results

Italics indicate driver practiced this car but did not race.

Statistics
 Provisional Pole Position - #2 Allan Grice - 2:16.16
 Pole Position - #15 Gary Scott - 2:17.159
 Fastest Lap - #2 Allan Grice - 2:18.99
 Average Speed - 155 km/h
 Race Time - 6:30:35.68

Mike Burgmann
The 1986 James Hardie 1000 is unfortunately also remembered for the death of Sydney privateer Mike Burgmann. On lap 5, Burgmann's Holden VK Commodore SS Group A and the privateer Jaguar XJS of his friend Garry Willmington were neck and neck over the notorious second hump on Conrod Straight at approximately  when the front of the Commodore got airborne (as cars did coming over the hump at that speed, more so for cars on the right hand side or outside part of the track which is where Burgmann was). The front of the Commodore moved slightly to the left and Burgmann, who was only a part-time racer, tried to correct by turning the wheel to the right. Unfortunately for Burgmann, the front tyres suddenly gripped when they landed and the car then turned into and hit the tyre barrier at the bottom of the well-known curved bridge at the end of Conrod with unabated speed causing the entire front end to be pushed back to the firewall. The car's roll cage did its job and the cabin survived the violent impact mostly intact. However, when officials reached the car they found Burgmann in what would normally be the back seat of the vehicle. While his driving seat had remained intact the force of the impact had broken the seat belt buckle which caused his body to be thrown out of the seat. Mike Burgmann became the first driver to die while competing in the Bathurst 1000 when he was pronounced dead on arrival at Bathurst Hospital.

See also
 1986 Australian Touring Car season

References

External links
Bathurst 1000 winners at CAMS Online Manual of Motor Sport > Race > About CAMS > Titles - Australian Titles
Race results at www.touringcarracing.net
Race results at www.uniquecarsandparts.com.au
Race images at www.autopics.com.au

Motorsport in Bathurst, New South Wales
James Hardie 1000